Mark Benjamin (born 1947) is an American documentary filmmaker best known for the Sundance TV series Brick City and the feature film Slam.  His most recent television series, Chicagoland aired on CNN in 2014.

Film and television

References

External links 
 Brick City on Sundance Channel
 Mark Benjamin's website
 

Living people
1947 births
American documentary filmmakers